Lebusa (Lower Sorbian: Lubuš) is a municipality in the Elbe-Elster district, in Brandenburg, Germany.

History
From 1815 to 1944, Lebusa was part of the Prussian Province of Saxony. From 1944 to 1945, it was part of the Province of Halle-Merseburg. From 1952 to 1990, it was part of the Bezirk Cottbus of East Germany.

Demography 

Detailed data sources are to be found in the Wikimedia Commons.

References

External links 
 

Localities in Elbe-Elster